Night Warning may refer to:

 Butcher, Baker, Nightmare Maker, later released as Night Warning, a 1981 American exploitation horror film
 Night Warning (1946 film), a French war drama film